Serra de Llaberia is a mountain chain in Catalonia, Spain located between the Prades and the Tivissa-Vandellòs Mountains.

It is part of the Catalan Pre-Coastal Range. The main peaks are Mola de Llaberia (918.3 m), La Miranda (918 m) and Mont-redon (864 m).

This mountain range is named after Llaberia village, now a town within the Tivissa municipal term.
The Serra de Montalt mountain range is a subrange of the main Llaberia range.

See also
Montalt
Catalan Pre-Coastal Range
Mountains of Catalonia

References

External links

 Muntanyes de Tivissa-Vandellòs
 Consorci Serra de Llaberia

Llaberia
Baix Camp
Ribera d'Ebre